The Daguinaspididae is family of early  Cambrian trilobites found in Morocco, Ukraine, and Siberia.

References 

Fallotaspidoidea
Trilobite families
Cambrian trilobites
Cambrian first appearances
Cambrian Series 2 extinctions